Jeff FitzGerald (born April 18, 1960) is a former American football coach. FitzGerald has previously served as a linebackers coach for the Washington Redskins, Arizona Cardinals, Baltimore Ravens, Cincinnati Bengals, and Indianapolis Colts.

Coaching career
On January 23, 2008, Fitzgerald was named the linebackers coach for the Cincinnati Bengals. Four years later, he joined Chuck Pagano's staff at the Indianapolis Colts in the same capacity, but was fired after the 2016 season.

In 2019, he became the defensive coordinator for the DC Defenders of the XFL.

References

External links
 Indianapolis Colts bio

1960 births
Living people
Cincinnati Bengals coaches
DC Defenders coaches
Indianapolis Colts coaches